Vice presidents of Guyana is a political position in Guyana.
The Prime Minister of Guyana serves as the First Vice President and acts as the constitutional successor for the President of Guyana in case of a vacancy. Historically, other members of the cabinet have also been appointed as Vice Presidents, who can perform the functions of the President. 
Vice presidency was created in October 1980 when the executive presidency was created.

A history of the office holder follows.

References

See also
President of Guyana
Prime Minister of Guyana

Politics of Guyana
Guyana
Vice presidents of Guyana
Government of Guyana
1980 establishments in Guyana